The 2002–03 NBA season was the 76ers 54th season in the National Basketball Association, and 40th season in Philadelphia. During the off-season, the Sixers acquired Keith Van Horn and former 76ers center Todd MacCulloch from the New Jersey Nets; Van Horn was originally drafted by the Sixers as the second pick in the 1997 NBA draft. The Sixers got off to a fast start winning 15 of their first 19 games, but would then lose 14 of their next 18 games, holding a 25–24 record at the All-Star break. In December, the team acquired Kenny Thomas from the Houston Rockets in a three-team trade. The Sixers improved on their last season posting a nine-game winning streak at midseason, finishing second in the Atlantic Division with a 48–34 record, with the #4 seed in the Eastern Conference.

For the first time in his career, Allen Iverson played a full 82-game season, averaging 27.6 points, 5.5 assists and 2.7 steals per game (he would have another in 2007–08 while with the Denver Nuggets). He was named to the All-NBA Second Team, was selected for the 2003 NBA All-Star Game, and also finished in sixth place in Most Valuable Player voting. In addition, Van Horn averaged 15.9 points and 7.1 rebounds per game, while Eric Snow provided the team with 12.9 points, 6.6 assists and 1.6 steals per game, and was named to the NBA All-Defensive Second Team, Derrick Coleman provided with 9.4 points and 7.0 rebounds per game, and Aaron McKie contributed 9.0 points and 1.6 steals per game.

The Sixers defeated the New Orleans Hornets led by Baron Davis in six games in the Eastern Conference First Round of the playoffs, but they could not go further in the next round, as they lost to the Detroit Pistons in six games in the Eastern Conference Semi-finals. Following the season, Van Horn was traded to the New York Knicks.

This season was head coach Larry Brown's last in Philadelphia as he resigned on Memorial Day, 2003. Brown would later go on to coach the Detroit Pistons, where he helped the team win the 2004 NBA Championship. He led the team to another Finals appearance in 2005. The Sixers wouldn't advance past the First Round again until 2012 when they defeated the Bulls in 6 games.

Offseason
In the 2002 NBA draft, the 76ers drafted Czech swingman Jiří Welsch and forward-center Sam Clancy (Clancy would not play in any games in the NBA). The Sixers also made three trades on draft day. Their first trade was with the Golden State Warriors. They traded their first round pick, Jiří Welsch, for a 2004 2nd round draft pick and a 2005 1st round draft pick. In their second trade, they traded Speedy Claxton to the San Antonio Spurs for Mark Bryant, Randy Holcomb, and John Salmons. Their third and final trade of the night was with the Atlanta Hawks. They traded a 2004 2nd round draft pick and a 2006 2nd round draft pick to the Hawks for Efthimios Rentzias.

On July 25, the 76ers signed Greg Buckner and Monty Williams.

On August 6, the Sixers traded Dikembe Mutombo to the New Jersey Nets for Todd MacCulloch and Keith Van Horn. This trade marked the beginning of MacCulloch's second tenure with the franchise.

On August 27, the Sixers signed Brian Skinner.

On September 30, the Sixers signed Art Long and William Avery. Avery would not play any games with Philadelphia.

On October 11, the Sixers waived Alvin Jones. On the 23rd, they waived Damone Brown.

Draft picks

Roster

Roster Notes
 Center Samuel Dalembert missed the entire season due to a knee injury.

Regular season

Season standings

z – clinched division title
y – clinched division title
x – clinched playoff spot

Record vs. opponents

Game log

Playoffs

|- align="center" bgcolor="#ccffcc"
| 1
| April 20
| New Orleans
| W 98–90
| Allen Iverson (55)
| Keith Van Horn (10)
| Eric Snow (10)
| First Union Center19,711
| 1–0
|- align="center" bgcolor="#ccffcc"
| 2
| April 23
| New Orleans
| W 90–85
| Allen Iverson (29)
| Kenny Thomas (16)
| Derrick Coleman (6)
| First Union Center20,229
| 2–0
|- align="center" bgcolor="#ffcccc"
| 3
| April 26
| @ New Orleans
| L 85–99
| Allen Iverson (28)
| Keith Van Horn (9)
| Allen Iverson (7)
| New Orleans Arena17,320
| 2–1
|- align="center" bgcolor="#ccffcc"
| 4
| April 28
| @ New Orleans
| W 96–87
| Allen Iverson (22)
| Kenny Thomas (8)
| Eric Snow (12)
| New Orleans Arena16,243
| 3–1
|- align="center" bgcolor="#ffcccc"
| 5
| April 30
| New Orleans
| L 91–93
| Allen Iverson (30)
| Kenny Thomas (14)
| Iverson, Snow (7)
| First Union Center19,403
| 3–2
|- align="center" bgcolor="#ccffcc"
| 6
| May 2
| @ New Orleans
| W 107–103
| Allen Iverson (45)
| Keith Van Horn (18)
| Eric Snow (9)
| New Orleans Arena18,570
| 4–2
|-

|- align="center" bgcolor="#ffcccc"
| 1
| May 6
| @ Detroit
| L 87–98
| Allen Iverson (27)
| Derrick Coleman (8)
| Allen Iverson (8)
| The Palace of Auburn Hills22,076
| 0–1
|- align="center" bgcolor="#ffcccc"
| 2
| May 8
| @ Detroit
| L 97–104 (OT)
| Allen Iverson (31)
| Kenny Thomas (19)
| Allen Iverson (7)
| The Palace of Auburn Hills22,076
| 0–2
|- align="center" bgcolor="#ccffcc"
| 3
| May 10
| Detroit
| W 93–83
| Allen Iverson (25)
| Kenny Thomas (14)
| Allen Iverson (11)
| First Union Center20,743
| 1–2
|- align="center" bgcolor="#ccffcc"
| 4
| May 11
| Detroit
| W 95–82
| Allen Iverson (36)
| Derrick Coleman (15)
| Allen Iverson (11)
| First Union Center20,549
| 2–2
|- align="center" bgcolor="#ffcccc"
| 5
| May 14
| @ Detroit
| L 77–78
| Derrick Coleman (23)
| Derrick Coleman (11)
| Allen Iverson (9)
| The Palace of Auburn Hills22,076
| 2–3
|- align="center" bgcolor="#ffcccc"
| 6
| May 16
| Detroit
| L 89–93 (OT)
| Allen Iverson (38)
| Kenny Thomas (14)
| Allen Iverson (9)
| First Union Center20,888
| 2–4
|-

Player statistics

Season

Playoffs

Awards and records
 Allen Iverson, All-NBA Second Team
 Eric Snow, NBA All-Defensive Second Team

References

See also
 2002–03 NBA season

Philadelphia 76ers seasons
Philadelphia
Philadelphia
Philadelphia